Malacocottus is a genus of fatheads native to the northern Pacific Ocean. Malacocottus are typically occupied in the benthic zone near the bottom of the northern Pacific Ocean.

Species
There are currently 4 recognized species in this genus:
 Malacocottus aleuticus (Smith,1904)
 Malacocottus gibber Ki. Sakamoto, 1930
 Malacocottus kincaidi C. H. Gilbert & J. C. Thompson, 1905 (Blackfin sculpin)
 Malacocottus zonurus T. H. Bean, 1890 (Darkfin sculpin)

FishBase recognizes 4 species in this genus but other authorities treat M. aleuticus as a synonym of M. zonurus.

References

Further reading
 
 
 

Psychrolutidae
Taxa named by Tarleton Hoffman Bean
Marine fish genera